Tarachand Patel is an Indian politician. He was elected to the Lok Sabha, the lower house of the Parliament of India, from Khargone in Madhya Pradesh as a member of the Indian National Congress (1999-2004).

References

External links
 Official biographical sketch in Lok Sabha website

Lok Sabha members from Madhya Pradesh
India MPs 1999–2004
Indian National Congress politicians
1941 births
Living people